"Red" as a slur or epithet may refer to:

 Communist; a Western and especially American usage until the end of the Cold War was to refer to communists as "reds" and communism as the "red peril"; derived from frequent use of red as the dominant color in flags of communist countries; capitalization varies, leaning lower-case
 Redskin; "Red" (usually as an adjective, e.g. in "the Red Man", "Red Indians") is a short form; refers to Native Americans, especially in North America; more often considered offensive since the mid-20th century; capitalization varies, leaning upper-case
 Supporter of the Republican Party (United States); the symbolic color of the party is red (versus blue for the Democratic Party), with a US state that is predominantly Republican often referred to as a "red state"; generally not considered offensive by itself (only when used derisively); usually lower-case

Political slurs for people